Walter Harris may refer to:
Walter Edward Harris (1904–1999), Canadian politician
Walter Edgar Harris (1915–2011), Canadian chemist
Walter Harris (author) (1925–2019), British author and broadcaster
Walter Harris (artist) (1931–2009), Canadian artist
Walter Harris (football manager), English football manager
Walter Harris (historian) (1686–1761), Irish historian
Walter Burton Harris (1866–1933), English journalist, writer, traveller and socialite
Walter Alexander Harris (1875–1958), lawyer, writer, and U.S. Army officer
Walt Harris (cornerback) (born 1974), American football cornerback
Walt Harris (defensive back) (born 1964), American football defensive back
Walt Harris (coach) (born 1946), former American football player and coach
Walt Harris (fighter) (born 1983), American mixed martial artist
Walter Harris, the real name of Pee-Wee Harris, a fictional character in Boys' Life comics

See also
Wally Harris (disambiguation)
Walter Harris Loveys (1920–1969), British politician